The Guadalupe spiny softshell turtle (Apalone spinifera guadalupensis) is a subspecies of soft-shelled turtle native to the United States, in the state of Texas. Their range is limited only to the Nueces and Guadalupe rivers, and their immediate tributaries.

References

External links

Turtle Field Guide: Spiny Softshell Subspecies

Apalone
Endemic fauna of Texas
Turtles of North America
Guadalupe River (Texas)
Nueces River
Reptiles of the United States
Reptiles described in 1962
Taxa named by Robert G. Webb
Taxobox trinomials not recognized by IUCN